Unnat Jyoti by Affordable LEDs for All (UJALA) was a project to distribute efficient LED lighting, launched by Prime Minister of India Narendra Modi on 5 Jan 2015. The project is spearheaded by the Energy Efficiency Services Limited. In non-subsidized LED lamp distribution projects, this program is considered the world's largest. In May 2017, the Government of India announced that they were expanding the LED distribution project to the United Kingdom.

See also
 Energy Conservation Building Code

References

Energy conservation in India
Government schemes in India
Modi administration initiatives
Ministry of Power (India)
2015 establishments in India